is a 2004 Japanese comedy film directed by the Japanese filmmaker Katsuhide Motoki about a young student who works in a convenience store, and five middle-aged men who develop crushes on her.

The film is set in a rural town and features lacrosse prominently. The cast includes Rena Tanaka as Keiko Obayashi (the student) and Akira Emoto as Nabe-yan (the leader of the five men).

Plot
Keiko Obayashi is a third year chemistry student in Tokyo. After finding her boyfriend in the bathtub with another student, she takes a train out of Tokyo. She wakes up in rural Masao, where she soon finds a job working in a newly opened convenience store.

Meanwhile, five middle-aged men who run local shops are worried about the competition from the new store, and plan to disrupt it. However, they all fall in love with Keiko as soon as they see her inside the store.

After following her one-day, Nabe discovers that she plays lacrosse at the university. The men decide to take up lacrosse in an effort to get a date with her. The film follows them as they practice in secret, are found out by Keiko who agrees to coach them, and finally play a match against a lacrosse team from America who are attracted by the Native American nickname (Geronimo) of one of their players.

The men are heavily defeated, but Geronimo becomes a hero when he scores the team's only point, and the film ends with him flying to America with the Americans.

External links

Films directed by Katsuhide Motoki
2003 films
2000s sports comedy films
Films with screenplays by Kankurō Kudō
Japanese sports comedy films
Lacrosse films
Films set in universities and colleges
Films set in Tokyo
2003 comedy films
2004 comedy films
2004 films
2000s Japanese films
2000s Japanese-language films